Douglas da Silva Teixeira (born 29 March 2001), known as Douglas or DG, is a Brazilian footballer who plays as a left back for Botafogo.

Club career
A Resende youth graduate, DG made his first team debut on 28 June 2020, coming on as a late substitute in a 2–0 Campeonato Carioca away win over Madureira. On 4 February 2022, he signed a new three-year contract with the club.

DG scored his first senior goal on 20 March 2022, netting a last-minute winner in a 1–0 away success over Portuguesa-RJ. On 11 April, he moved on loan to Botafogo, being initially assigned to the under-23 squad.

DG made his first team debut for Bota on 14 July 2022, playing the last 15 minutes in a 2–0 home loss against América Mineiro.

Career statistics

References

2001 births
Living people
Brazilian footballers
Association football defenders
Campeonato Brasileiro Série A players
Resende Futebol Clube players
Botafogo de Futebol e Regatas players